Kukkapalli Maneesha (born 29 April 1995) is an Indian badminton player who currently plays women's and mixed doubles. She partners Sanyogita Ghorpade for women's doubles events and previously partnered with J. Meghana, P. V. Sindhu. For mixed doubles events she partners with  Satwiksairaj Rankireddy, and previously, Manu Attri and K. Nandagopal.

Achievements

South Asian Games 
Women's doubles

BWF Grand Prix (1 runner-up) 
The BWF Grand Prix had two levels, the Grand Prix and Grand Prix Gold. It was a series of badminton tournaments sanctioned by the Badminton World Federation (BWF) and played between 2007 and 2017.

Mixed doubles

  BWF Grand Prix Gold tournament
  BWF Grand Prix tournament

BWF International Challenge/Series (9 titles, 8 runners-up) 
Women's doubles

Mixed doubles

  BWF International Challenge tournament
  BWF International Series tournament
  BWF Future Series tournament

References

External links
 

1995 births
Living people
Racket sportspeople from Guntur
Sportswomen from Andhra Pradesh
21st-century Indian women
21st-century Indian people
Indian female badminton players
Indian national badminton champions
South Asian Games gold medalists for India
South Asian Games silver medalists for India
South Asian Games medalists in badminton
20th-century Indian women